Mohamed Mesbahi (born 29 April 1969) is a Moroccan boxer. He competed at the 1992 Summer Olympics, 1996 Summer Olympics and the 2000 Summer Olympics.

References

1969 births
Living people
Moroccan male boxers
Olympic boxers of Morocco
Boxers at the 1992 Summer Olympics
Boxers at the 1996 Summer Olympics
Boxers at the 2000 Summer Olympics
Sportspeople from Casablanca
AIBA World Boxing Championships medalists
Light-middleweight boxers